Al-'Urayfiyya was a Palestinian Arab village in the Safad Subdistrict. It was depopulated during the 1947–1948 Civil War in Mandatory Palestine on April 1, 1948, by the Palmach's First Battalion of Operation Yiftach. It was located 21.5 km northeast of Safad. The village has been mostly destroyed with the exception of the remains of a water mill and masonry channel.

References

Bibliography

External links
 Welcome To al-'Urayfiyya
al-'Urayfiyya, Zochrot
'Urayfiyya, Villages of Palestine

Arab villages depopulated during the 1948 Arab–Israeli War
District of Safad